Probable ATP-dependent RNA helicase DDX41 is an enzyme that in humans is encoded by the DDX41 gene.

DEAD box proteins, characterized by the conserved motif Asp-Glu-Ala-Asp (DEAD), are putative RNA helicases. They are implicated in a number of cellular processes involving alteration of RNA secondary structure, such as translation initiation, nuclear and mitochondrial splicing, and ribosome and spliceosome assembly. Based on their distribution patterns, some members of the DEAD box protein family are believed to be involved in embryogenesis, spermatogenesis, and cellular growth and division. This gene encodes a member of this family. The function of this member has not been determined. Based on studies in Drosophila, the abstrakt gene is widely required during post-transcriptional gene expression.Germ line DDX41 mutations define a unique subtype of myeloid neoplasms. <ref>https://doi.org/ 10.1182/blood.2022018221./ref>

References

Further reading